Walter Bastenie (born 29 May 1910, date of death unknown) was a Belgian ice hockey player. He competed in the men's tournament at the 1936 Winter Olympics.

References

1910 births
Year of death missing
Olympic ice hockey players of Belgium
Ice hockey players at the 1936 Winter Olympics
Place of birth missing
Belgian ice hockey right wingers